The wardrobe of Mary, Queen of Scots, was described in several contemporary documents, and many records of her costume have been published.

Clothes for a queen
Mary, Queen of Scots (1542-1587) lived in France between 1548 and 1560 and clothing bought for her is particularly well-documented in the year 1551. Her wedding dress in 1558 was described in some detail. More detailed records of her costume survive from her time in Scotland, with purchases recorded in the royal treasurer's accounts and wardrobe accounts kept by Servais de Condé. Inventories were made of her clothing and her jewellery during her time in Scotland and after she abdicated and went to England. Details of her costume on the day of her execution at Fotheringhay in 1587 were widely reported and circulated in manuscript.

Few details of known of Mary's clothes in infancy in Scotland, except that Margaret Balcomie, or Malcomy, had an allowance of soap and coal to warm the water to wash her linen. In 1548 her mother, Mary of Guise, asked her envoy Henri Cleutin to buy cloth of gold for a gown for her, from the merchants who served the French court. In France in 1551, her clothes were embroidered with jewels, a white satin skirt front and sleeves featured 120 diamonds and rubies, and coifs for her hair had gold buttons or rubies, sewn by her tailor Nicolas du Moncel.

Masques in France
She wore farthingales, and danced in masques (with the French governess Françoise d'Humières) in costumes made with lightweight silver and gold fabrics decorated with silver and gold metallic spangles. These were a type of sequin or "oes" called papillotes in French. In 1554, Mary played the Delphic Sibyl and Mary Fleming was the Erythraean Sibyl in a masque written by Mellin de Saint-Gelais.

In 1554 her governess Françoise d'Estainville, Dame de Paroy, wrote to Mary of Guise asking permission to buy two diamonds to lengthen one of Mary's headbands with rubies and pearls. She also wanted to buy a new gown of cloth-of-gold for Mary to wear at the wedding of Nicolas, Count of Vaudémont (1524–1577), and Princess Joanna of Savoy-Nemours (1532–1568) at Fontainebleau. This new costume was intended to emulate the fashion adopted by the French princesses of the blood, Elisabeth of Valois and Claude of France (1547–1575). In a letter to her mother, Mary mentions a pair of embroidered sleeves that were being made for her in Scotland.

Coin portraits
Some of Mary's Scottish coinage was designed by John Acheson, who visited the court in France in 1553. Coins including the gold ryal show her in profile, wearing a caul or hairnet with two jewelled bands. Several sets of these bands appear in her jewel inventories listed in French in pairs as bordures or brodures, the bordure de touret at the forehead and the longer bordure d'oriellette over the head. In England, the equivalent accessories for French hoods were called upper and nether billiments.

Mourning clothes in white and black
After her first husband Francis II of France died in 1560, Mary wore a form of mourning called deuil blanc, involving a white pleated cambric veil. Her portrait was drawn by François Clouet, and reproduced in several painted versions made after her death. The paintings indicate either a dark blue or green gown, not present in the drawing. Mary discussed her image as a woman in mourning with the English ambassador Nicholas Throckmorton in the context of sending her portrait to Queen Elizabeth. Throckmorton's letter suggests she was not wearing the deuil when they spoke in August 1560. She also wrote a poem on her portrait, image, deuil, and her pale violet cheek. The verse may be a response to the courtier poet Pierre de Bourdeille, seigneur de Brantôme, who wrote of her snow white complexion merging with the white deuil.

In September 1561 tailors and "boys" made black mourning "dule" riding cloaks and skirts for Mary, Queen of Scots, and her 15 ladies to wear at her Entry to Edinburgh. Mary wore black Florence serge, the other costumes were made from 50 ells of cheaper black stemming.

The royal accounts for November 1561 mention the women of the household transitioning into a "second mourning", or perhaps receiving their second allowance of black velvet mourning clothes. In December 1561, Mary solemnly observed the anniversary of her husband's death with Obertino Solaro, Monsieur de Moret, the ambassador of Savoy. The English ambassador, Thomas Randolph, noted that the Scottish nobles at court did not wearing mourning "dewle" for the day. One "dule weid" mourning outfit comprised a large veil and seven components or pieces of "black crisp of silk".

In April 1562, Randolph wrote about plans for Mary's interview with Elizabeth in England, and he thought the Scottish party would be dressed in black cloth, to suit Mary's wearing of mourning clothes and also save money. At the end of May, Mary invited the Hepburn or Cockburn Laird of Ormistoun, the Earl of Cassilis, and others to come the borders for the meeting of the queens. They were instructed that her "whole train will be clad in dule, therefore address you and such as will be in your company in like sort". The meeting (at York) was cancelled. Mary made a progress to Aberdeen and Inverness Castle instead.

Mary incorporated mourning clothes into the ceremony when she married Lord Darnley on 29 July 1565. She entered the chapel of Holyroodhouse wearing "a great mourning gown of black" with a hood, a costume said to resemble her dress at her first husband's funeral. After the wedding and mass, she went to her bedchamber and courtiers unpinned these garments, and her ladies put on her new costume. There were three wedding rings, a gold ring with a rich diamond and red enamelling was perhaps the principal. Her costume and its solemn removal was described by Thomas Randolph in a letter to the Earl of Leicester:She had on her backe the greate murning gowne of blacke, with the greate wyde murning hood, not unlyke unto that whiche she woore the deulfull daye of the buriall of her husbonde ... there [in her chamber] beinge required according to the solemnitie to off her care, and leave asyde these sorrowful garments ... she suffreth them that stood by, every man that could approve, to tayke owte a pyne, and so being committed unto her ladies, changed her garments.

Mary's mourning clothes after the death of Darnley in February 1567 required 24 papers of pins. The fabric was black serge of Florence, with some black plaid, the skirt and sleeves were silk chamlet lined with taffeta, the headdresses were linen and camerage (cambric). Florian Broshere, the tapestry worker and embroiderer, draped her bed and hanged the chapel at Holyrood with fine French black.

Clothing in the inventories and treasurer's accounts
During Mary's adult reign in Scotland, purchases of textiles for her clothes and payments for tailors appear in the accounts of the Lord Treasurer. Her mother, Mary of Guise, as Regent (1554-1560) had paid for her clothes from her own French incomes. Mary had a wardrobe as a department of her household, with several officers and artisans including tailors and embroiderers, and the "tapissiers" who looked after tapestry, beds, and furniture with her menusier, the household carpenter or upholsterer. In March 1566 she rewarded her French embroiderer, Pier Veray, with the lucrative position of clerk of the customs of Edinburgh, an office taken from a suspect in the murderer of David Riccio. There were workers outside the household too, mostly in Edinburgh, including the Flemish shoemaker Fremyn Alezard and the furrier Archibald Leche. Servais de Condé, a valet of the chamber, kept a written record in French tracking the use of the more expensive fabrics. A broadly similar record of fabrics used by Mary of Guise from 1552 to 1554 also survives.

In this example from July 1564, black velvet was given to Mary's tailor Jehan de Compiegne to make a purse for kerchiefs:Plus a Jehan de Conpiegne i quartier de veloux noyr pour faire une grand bource pour la Royne lequelz fert a metre les mouchoy.More, to Jehan de Compiegne, a quarter of black velvet to make a big purse for the queen, which she carries to hold kerchiefs.

Some linen mouchoirs in the inventories may have been handkerchiefs, while others appear to be head coverings. Other linen items include pairs of callesons or caleçons, linen hose or stockings or undergarments which were also made for the fool known as La Jardiniere.

Inventories of Mary's clothes written in French survive in the National Archives of Scotland and were printed by Joseph Robertson in 1863. This is an example of a skirt, with a note that it was given to the queen's favourite Mary Beaton:Une vasquyne de satin cramoysy enrechye d'une bande d'ung passement d'argent faict a jour et borde d'ung passement d'argent.Au moy de Fevvrier la Royne donne laditz vasquine a Mademoysel de Beton.

This was one of fifteen embroidered skirts with passementerie listed in 1562. There were six plain skirts, and fifteen skirts of cloth of gold or silver. A cloth of gold skirt with matching sleeves was given to Magdalen Livingstone for her wedding. A skirt of cloth of silver was unpicked in 1566 for fabric to dress a bed. Mary had several skirts made to match doublets, in silk camlet, velvet, and satin. Mary wore skirts over a shaped farthingale, these were lined or doubled with taffeta, and their bell-shaped form stiffened with "girds" of whale baleen. In December 1563 the tailor Jacques de Senlis reworked an old black velvet skirt that had belonged to Mary of Guise into a new style for the queen.

The account mention furnishings and beds, and a variety of accessories including velvet collars for the queen's little dogs, "les petitz chiens de la Royne". The Scots language and older French vocabulary in the inventories of Mary, Queen of Scots can be difficult to read and interpret. Some help is given by the original cross-referencing numbers which were printed in the 19th-century editions. French and Scots language entries for the same item can be compared, in many cases giving insightful contemporary translations. The letter "H" seen in the inventories refers to items confiscated from Huntly Castle, and a letter "S" means an item was at Stirling Castle.

Notes added to the inventories record gifts of clothing that Mary made from her wardrobe to favourite aristocrats, courtiers, and women of her household. She gave a skirt to the "little daughter of her laundress", Margaret Douchall who later followed her mother into royal service and married Jerome Bowie, a servant in the wine cellar.

Costumes were given to household servants. In March 1567 five pages and seven lackeys were provided with riding cloaks of black stemming, pourpoints (doublets), and Mantua-style bonnets and hats by the tailor John Powlett. The list of fabrics survives in French and Scots. The smart and uniform appearance of these servants, visible when Mary travelled, greatly contributed to the impression of royal magnificence. These black clothes were the official mourning for the death of Lord Darnley.

Masques, ceremony, and special costume
Mary wore her crown and robes for state ceremonies, including the first day of the Parliament of Scotland on 26 May 1563. Her robes were later described as a "rob ryall of purper velvot embroiderit about with gold, furrit with spottit armenis (ermine) and a band about". Scottish monarchs had robes for their coronations and for Parliament. When Charles I came to Scotland for his coronation in 1633 he had the old Parliament robes of James IV refurbished and perfumed for his use. In March 1566, Mary's tailor Jehan de Compiegne made her headdresses of cloth of silver to wear in Parliament, presumably when not wearing the crown.

Mary's Highland costume
Mary and her court wore Highland clothes in Argyll and during visits to the north and Inverness. In June 1563 the court prepared "Hyeland apparell" for the progress to Argyll and Inveraray. Mary would wear a "marvellous fair" costume which had been a gift from Agnes Campbell the wife of James MacConel or MacDonald of Dunyvaig.

The French author Brantôme claimed to have seen Mary in Highland costume. He said she looked like a goddess, as her beauty transformed such costume, as anyone who had seen her portrait in such clothes would agree. Such a portrait, if it ever existed, does not survive. Brantôme, like other French writers of the period, writes of the "barbarous fashions of the savages of her country".

Locally made woollen tartan or plaid was bought in Inverness. These cloths may not have closely resembled modern tartan fabrics. Some "Highland" items appear in inventories, including three Highland mantles in black, blue, and white, perhaps relating to these progresses, or used as masque costume. Among Mary's smocks or shirts, called "sarks", were four English blackwork sarks, and a "hieland syd sark of yallow lyning pasmentit with purpour silk and silver". Changing clothes to cross regional boundaries was traditional. Randolph, the English ambassador, joked about having to wear a yellow "safferon shyrte or a hylande pladde" if he went to Argyll.

Masques
Costumes were made by Mary's tailor Jacques de Senlis for dancers and lute players who performed for Mary and the court during a wedding at Castle Campbell on 10 January 1563. They were dressed as shepherds in white taffeta with purses or satchels made of white damask.

A masque in December 1563 involved three large blue velvet Swiss bonnets and wigs. There was also a blue velvet bonnet for Nichola the Fool, and Mademoiselle Rallay was given canvas to fashion wigs. The occasion may have been her twenty-first birthday, where she tired herself with "dancing over long". Mary's tailor Jehan de Compiegne made costumes from orange "changing" or shot taffeta for a masque in February 1565 at Holyrood Palace, with a smaller costume in the same fabric for a young girl at court. The English ambassador Thomas Randolph said the Shrove Tide banquets of February 1564 at the Scottish court were great as those given at a royal wedding. The four Maries and the queen's ladies wore white and black at one banquet, and verses were recited as the courses were brought in by gentlemen wearing black and white. Mary seems to have emulated the fashion of other courts by dressing herself and her ladies in black and white for the masque, echoing colours adopted by Diane de Poitiers.

Masquing and male costume

Several sources refer to Mary and her ladies wearing male costume for dance and for disguising or "guising", masked visits and promenades in Scottish towns. For a masque to entertain a French ambassador, Jacques de Angennes, seigneur de Rambouillet, the tailor Jehan de Compiegne made six costumes decorated with flames made of cloth of gold reused from old cushion covers. During the masque the queen's ladies, "cled in men's apperrell", presented 8 Scottish dirks or daggers to the French guests, with black velvet scabbards embroidered with gold. A chroncle called the Diurnal of Occurrents described the scene in February 1566:And the sammin nycht at evin, our soveranis maid ane banket to the ambassatour foirsaid, in the auld chappell of Halyrudhous, quhilk wes reapparrellit with fyne tapestrie, and hung magnificentlie, be the saidis lordis maid the maskery efter supper in ane honourable maner. And upoun the ellevint day of the said moneth, the king and quene in lyikmanner bankettit the ambassatour; and at evin our soveranis maid the maskrie and mumschance, in the quhilk the quenis grace, and all hir Maries and ladies wer all cled in men's apperrell; and everie ane of thame presentit ane quhingar, bravelie and maist artificiallie made and embroiderit with gold, to the ambassatour and his gentilmen, everie one of thame according to his estate.

The ambassador stayed in Edinburgh's Canongate, and subsequently a number of local women were slandered as prostitutes and said to have visited him dressed in men's clothes.

On Easter Monday in April 1565 Mary and her ladies dressed like "bourgeois wives" and walked up and down the steep streets of Stirling, collecting contributions for a banquet. Thomas Randolph's report of this Easter dressing-up custom, possibly associated with Hocktide, reveals that the clothes worn by ladies at court were notably different from the costume worn by merchant's wives or other women living and working in Scotland's burgh towns, probably both in terms of fabrics and style. Mary celebrated Easter at Stirling Castle this year, not in Edinburgh. She had compared herself to a "bourgeois wife" in February 1565 while staying in a merchant's house in St Andrews, keeping a small household with little ceremony, and no cloth of estate, the canopy used above a throne.

In the days after her marriage, in July 1565, Mary and Darnley walked up and down Edinburgh High Street in disguise. Mary is said to have danced around the Market Cross of Stirling in "homely sort" about a month after the birth of Prince James.

On 5 September 1566 Mary ordered fabrics for the household of her son, the future James VI, at Stirling Castle, for beds and bedding for Margaret Beaton, Lady Reres and the gentlewomen appointed as rockers of the prince's cradle. Taffeta was bought to make costumes for the masque at James' baptism. In January 1567 the tailor Jehan de de Compiegne was given clothes including a black "Almain" or German-style cloak. In February the jester George Styne or Stevin had a costume made of blue kersey, and in March Nichola the fool had new linen. 10 ells of linen were bought for lining Mary's bathtub, and canvas for bathing was delivered to Toussaint Courcelles.

On the night that Lord Darnley was killed by an explosion at the Kirk o'Field, Mary attended the wedding banquet and masque for her servant Bastian Pagez and Christily Hog. Mary gave the bride satin, velvet, and green ribbons for her gown. Darnley's father, the Earl of Lennox later produced a narrative of events which says that some witnesses said Mary was dressed in men's clothing on that night, "which apparel she loved oftentimes to be in, in dancings secretly with the King her husband, and going in masks by night through the street".

In conflict
When Mary was at Inverness in September 1562 she said, after seeing the armed guard return from watch at night, that she regretted she "was not a man to know what life it was to lie all night in the fields, or to walk upon the causeway with a jack and a knapschall (helmet), a Glasgow buckler, and a broad sword".

After the murder of Lord Darnley, when Mary seemed likely to marry the Earl of Bothwell, William Kirkcaldy of Grange wrote to the Earl of Bedford, an English diplomat, that Mary did not care if she lost France, England and Scotland for Bothwell's sake, and she had said she would go with him to the world's end in a white petticoat;sho caris not to lose France Ingland and her owne countrie for him, and sall go with him to the warldes ende in ane white peticote or she leve him.

A report written by the Captain of Inchkeith, Robert Anstruther, and a chronicle called the Diurnal of Occurrents, mention that Mary wore male clothing on her ride from Borthwick Castle to Dunbar Castle in 1567, and she is sometimes said to have been disguised as a page. Mary wore a short red petticoat at knee-length at Dunbar the next day before the battle of Carberry Hill. Anstruther's report written in French describes another item, but the words appear to be illegible. According to George Buchanan, Mary changed into a short skirt at Fawside Castle on the morning of 15 June 1567 before the battle of Carberry. She left some clothes behind in a chest, including a gown of black "estamet" (stemming) embroidered with grains of jet, a crimson chamlet dress, a plaid, a great cloak, and a hat embroidered with gold and silver, with a panache. The black gown was "faict a la souvaige", perhaps meaning Highland fashion.

An English soldier and border official, William Drury, heard another description of Mary's costume at this time, that she was dressed in  "after the attire and fashion of the women of Edinburgh, in a red petticoat tied with points, a partlet, a velvet hat, and muffler". The partlet, worn over the shoulders, does not frequently appear in the queen's inventories.

Abdication, Lochleven Castle, and England

Clothes and sewing thread for embroidery were sent to Mary in her prison at Lochleven Castle. On 17 July 1567 she requested the services of an embroiderer to draw patterns for her, to "draw forth such work as she would be occupied about". At this time, according to Nicholas Throckmorton, Mary thought she was seven weeks pregnant with Bothwell's child. On 3 September 1567 Mary wrote to Robert Melville to ask Servais de Condé to send silk thread and sewing gold and silver, doublets and skirts of black and white satin, a red incarnate doublet, a taffeta loose gown, clothes that she had asked Lady Livingstone to send, and clothes for her maidens. Mary also wanted camerage (cambric) and linen, and two pairs of sheets with black thread for embroidery, and needles and a mould (cushion) for net-work called "rasour" or "réseau", a bed cover, and dried plums and pears. Some of the request was fulfilled by new purchases by her half-brother Regent Moray in October. Green and black cloths, black and coloured silk thread, and hanks and silver and gold thread were bought for Servais de Condé to take to Mary.

A memorandum written in French survives of textiles and thread sent to Mary at Lochleven, Carlisle, and Bolton Castle. Mary tried to escape disguised in the clothes of her laundress, but was recognised by the boatmen on Loch Leven who returned her to the castle. Mary escaped from Lochleven on 2 May 1568, her disguise involved a borrowed red dress and changing her hairstyle so she looked like a local woman. Usually, Mary's hair was elaborately dressed by Mary Seton. Three days after her escape, her French cook Estienne Hauet (Stephen Hewat) and his wife Elles Boug packed four silk gowns, two velvet gowns, a chamlet gown, a satin partlet, and other items in a chest to send to the queen wherever she might be. After Langside, John Gordon of Lochinvar gave her clothes. When Mary arrived in England, "her attire was very mean", and she had no change of clothes. She wrote to Elizabeth from Workington on 17 May 1568, saying she had not changed her clothes since her escape, as she had been travelling by night.

Carlisle Castle 
At Carlisle Castle, Francis Knollys was impressed by the hairdressing skills of Mary Seton, who Mary said was the "finest busker, the finest dresser of a woman's head and hair that is to be seen in any country". Knollys wrote "among other pretty devices, yesterday and this day she did set such a curled hair upon the Queen, that was said to be a periwig that showed very delicately, and every other day lightly ... she hath a new device of head dressing, without any cost, and yet sets forth a woman gaily well". Mary had received clothes "of black colour" by 28 June 1568, and Knollys sent to Edinburgh for more of Mary's clothes, as "she seemeth to esteem not of any apparyll other than hyr owne". Andrew Melville of Garvock came to Carlisle bringing three gowns. The first consignment of clothes from Lochleven Castle to arrive in England for Mary proved inadequate, and she complained to Knollys that in three coffers sent by Regent Moray there was only one gown of taffeta, the rest only cloaks, saddle cloths, sleeves, partlets, coifs, and "such like trinketts".

Queen Elizabeth apparently hesitated to send her some of her own clothes, but did send 16 yards of black velvet, 16 yards of black satin and 10 yards of black taffeta, a gift interpreted by the costume historian Janet Arnold as a hint that Mary ought to be in mourning clothes. Mary's secretary Claude Nau mentions the receipt of this gift of textiles at Carlisle, packed in a small box and in shorter lengths than specified in Elizabeth's warrant. The Spanish diplomat, Guzmán de Silva, seems to have reported this particular gift to Phillip II as an unsuitable present for a queen comprising two old chemises, some black velvet, and a pair of shoes.

Francis Knollys sent Richard Graham alias Garse Ritchie, a servant of Lord Scrope, to bring more of Mary's clothes from Lochleven. He brought five cart loads and four laden horses to Bolton Castle on 20 July 1568. He went back to Scotland, where Regent Moray gave him a reward of 50 French crowns and a parcel of new clothing and costume fabric for his half-sister including; grey and black taffeta, black velvet, thread for stitching, jet buttons, and 12 pairs of leather shoes. Mary wanted Garse Richie to fetch her "jewels", the furs with gold mounts known as zibellini, from John Sempill of Beltrees but Moray would not allow this. Mary received her portable sounding alarm clock or chiming watch from Lochleven, kept in a purse of silver and grey réseau work which she may have made herself. She set up an old cloth of estate from Scotland above her chair in the Great Chamber at Bolton Castle, asserting her royal status.

Tutbury Castle 
A consignment of furnishing was sent to Tutbury Castle for Mary in January 1569 from the English great wardrobe and "removing wardrobe" and from the Tower of London. This included a group of tapestries, verdure tapestry bedcovers, bedding, and chairs and stools covered in crimson cloth of gold and other rich fabrics, and 2000 hooks and two hammers to hang the tapestry. Some hangings were sent to Tutbury from Sheffield by Bess of Hardwick, the Countess of Shrewsbury. Chambers were "hanged" with tapestry for Lady Livingstone and her husband, and for Mary Seton. There was tapestry for three rooms of Mary's apartment, the great bedchamber, her own bedchamber, and the chamber for her grooms. Mary arrived at Tutbury on 4 February 1569 and her French tailor Jacques Senlis and the tapestry worker and embroiderer Florian rejoined her household.

The Earl of Shrewsbury described her at Tutbury in March 1569, working at embroidery and making designs with Bess of Hardwick, Lady Livingstone, and Mary Seton. This was an innocent domestic activity, unlikely to result in conspiracy and sedition: "this Queen continueth daily resort unto my wife's chamber, where with the Lady Leviston and Mistress Seton, she useth to sit working with the needle, in which she much delights, and in devising of works, and her talk is altogether of indifferent trifling matters, without any sign of secret dealing or practice". The surviving results of their collaboration are known as the Oxburgh Hangings. In a letter of 10 September 1570, Mary mentioned that her servant Bastian Pagez devised or "invented" pieces of work, embroidery patterns, to cheer her up.

There were rumours that Mary would try to escape from captivity in April 1571. One plan was that she should pretend to fall ill while dancing. When she was carried to bed a companion in her clothes would take her place. Mary would escape, dressed as a man, and ride away. Another plan was that she would slip away during a hunt, leaving a companion dressed in her riding clothes. Again, Mary would find an opportunity to change into male clothing and ride away with a messenger. A third plan was for the queen to cut her hair and smear her face with filth, like a "turnbroche", a boy who turned a spit over the kitchen fire. Mary seems not to have attempted escape by such methods.

Mary had clothes sent to her from France. In November 1572 she wrote to the French ambassador Mothe-Fénelon from Sheffield, hoping he could ask her mother-in-law Catherine de' Medici to buy linen for herself and her ladies. A shopping list drawn up in 1572 by her tailor, Jehan de Compiegne, for Jean de Beaucaire, Seigneur de Puiguillon, gives an idea of clothes and textiles obtained from Paris. She may have imported similar goods during her years in Scotland, utilising her French income, although similar goods were available in Edinburgh merchants' booths. The lengths of fabrics were specified for some garments, robes of Florence serge, and doublets of satin lined with taffeta. The order included Milan-style points or fers, and points of jet, an apparently ready-made velvet Spanish-style gown, stockings, shoes, velvet and leather slippers, plain and embroidered handkerchiefs, and other items. The purchases were packed in two coffers or bahuts and shipped in May to the French ambassador Mothe-Fénélon in London to forward to Mary at Sheffield Castle. The clothes had not reached her by 10 June, so Mary wrote to Mothe Fénélon about the missing coffer her tailor had brought to London. Mary seems to have made a similar order in April 1573.

Sheffield, French clothes, and a will
In January 1576, the French ambassador Michel de Castelnau asked Elizabeth I to allow four trunks of French-made clothes to be delivered to Mary at Sheffield Manor by her tailor's servants. Mary made a will when she was at Sheffield Manor in February 1577. She wanted the executors who would arrange for her funeral to have her large bed of "cramoysi brun" embroidered velvet, her tapestries of the Story of Aeneas and the Story of Meleager, a table nef, and a suite of wall hangings of cloth of gold and violet velvet. She bequeathed an old bed of violet velvet to a French servant Baltassar Hully. Ten years later, the "cramoysi brun" bed was described as "old purple velvet, embroidered with cloth of silver and flowers, with curtains of purple damask, and a covering of serge furred with fox".

While at Sheffield in 1581, Marie Castelnau, the wife of the French ambassador in London, Michel de Castelnau, sent her a gown and a "soutane". Her tailor Jacques de Senlis had died and she wanted to employ Jehan de Compiegne, a tailor who had worked for her in Scotland. She asked James Beaton, Archbishop of Glasgow, to buy dress materials in Rouen for her, and forward them to the French ambassador Michel de Castelnau. Mary was able to buy silk fabrics for her clothes in France, using 1039 crowns from her French income.

Making gifts for Queen Elizabeth
Mary hoped to gain Elizabeth's favour by gift giving. Handmade items made personally or within the household could be highly regarded, especially if carefully chosen with insider advice and made from the finest materials. In 1574 Mary embroidered an incarnate or crimson satin skirt with silver thread using materials bought in London by the ambassador, Mothe Fénélon. She had sent him a sample of the silk required. She soon wrote for more incarnate silk thread, better quality thinner silver thread, and incarnate taffeta for the lining. Mothe-Fénélon presented the finished item to Elizabeth on 22 May, with a declaration of friendship, and reported to Charles IX of France that the gift was a success.

Presumably hopeful of an audience at the English court, Mary asked the Archbishop of Glasgow, her contact in Paris, to send coifs embroidered with gold and silver and the latest fashion in Italian ribbons and veils for her hair. She hoped that one of the French tailors who had served her in Scotland, Jean de Compiegne, would come to her at Sheffield.

Although she had few helpers for delicate work, Mary planned making more gifts for Elizabeth, including a "coiffure with the suite" and some lacework, "ouvrages de réseul". She asked Mothe Fénélon for advice on what Elizabeth would like best, and asked him to send lengths of gold passementerie, braids called "bisette", and silver spangles or oes which she called papillottes. Elizabeth remained cautious of Mary's gifts, and was reluctant to try some French sweets which Mothe Fénélon offered her as a gift from the brother of the chancellor of Mary's dowry, for fear of poison. William Cecil had written a memorandum for the safety of Elizabeth, advising caution with gifts of scented clothing and perfumed gloves.

Mary gave Elizabeth a skirt front or devant de cotte in July 1576, made in her household, and followed up with an embroidered casket and a headdress. She wrote that if the skirt pleased Elizabeth she could have others made, even more beautiful. Mary asked Elizabeth if she would send the pattern of the high necked bodice she wore, "un patron d'un de voz corps a haut collet" for her to copy.

Mary provided clothes for some of the women in her household. When she was at Worksop Manor in September 1583, she wrote to "Bess Pierpont", who was at home with her family. Mary was having a black gown made for her and had ordered her a "garniture", presumably of wire-work and jewellery, from London.

In 1584, Mary asked the French ambassador in London, Michel de Castelnau to take special care of her secret correspondence and pay the couriers well. He should pretend the money was for gold and silver embroidery thread he sent to her. His wife, Marie, sent her coifs to wear on her head in March 1585.

Clothes remaining in Edinburgh Castle, 1578
While Mary was England, and her son James VI was growing up at Stirling Castle, a substantial remainder of Mary's wardrobe and the furnishings of her palaces were locked up in Edinburgh Castle. An inventory was made in March 1578, written in the Scots Language, including her "gownes, vaskenis, skirtis, slevis, doublettis, vaillis, vardingallis, cloikis". The inventory exists in two copies, one in the National Archives of Scotland and another in the British Library. The taking of this inventory was described in the chronicle attributed to David Moysie.

Among the hundreds of items; "a Highland kirtle of black stemming embroidered with blue silk" was related to the black gown found in Mary's chest at Fawside, and a pair of white canvas shepherd's kirtles were remnants from a masque performed at Castle Campbell in 1563 at the wedding of Lord Doune. There were items of costume from court revelries and masques including feathers, golden shields, headdresses of silver, and "Egyptian" hats made of red and yellow fabrics. Accessories included; "huidis, quaiffis, collaris, rabattis, orilyeitis (fronts of hoods), napkins, caming cloths, covers of night gear, hose, shoes, and gloves". At least 36 pairs of her velvet shoes remained in Edinburgh Castle "of sundry colours passmented with gold and silver stored in Edinburgh Castle. These had probably been made for her by Fremyn Alezard.

There were sixty pieces of canvas marked up for embroidery, including a canvas bed valance, "drawin upoun paper and begun to sew", with nine pieces of sewing canvas, some drawn and some undrawn. Some pieces of half finished embroidery included the arms of House of Longueville, and had belonged to Mary of Guise, whose first husband was the Duke of Longueville.

Dolls and Mary's cabinet
In one coffer stored in Edinburgh Castle there was a set of dolls called "pippens" with their miniature wardrobe of farthingales, sleeves, and slippers. The dolls may have been intended for play, or used as fashion dolls disseminating patterns for creating new outfits for Mary and her ladies in waiting. In a treatise on collecting printed in 1565, Samuel Quiccheberg noted that princesses and queens sent each other dolls with details of foreign clothing. Mary's tailor Jacques de Senlis updated the dolls' costumes with grey damask and silver cloth in September 1563.

The dolls are listed in the inventory with miscellaneous items which appear to be a remainder of her cabinet of curiosities in Scotland. A cabinet room at Holyrood Palace had been fashioned for Mary by her valet Servais de Condé in September 1561, the walls lined with fabic called "Paris green". The work was financed with a loan from the banker and textile merchant Timothy Cagnioli.

The 1586 inventories

An inventory of Mary's wardrobe was made at Chartley Castle on 13 June 1586, written in French. The main headings are:
 Gowns or robes, including;
 A black velvet gown with a tail, embroidered with pearls, lined with black taffeta, with pearl buttons on the front and on the sleeves
 Another gown of crêpe, embroidered with jet, the bodice lined with white satin
 Another gown of black satin, lined with black taffeta, two velvets passements at the front
 Skirts or vasquines
 Another skirt of black taffeta, banded, lined with taffeta
 Another of black satin, lined with black taffeta, with two bands of velvet passementerie at the front
 Another of white satin, lined with white buckram, banded with beads of jet
 Doublets called pourpoincts
 Another of white satin, with taffeta cordons on the sleeves
 Doublets called juppes
 A jupe of "cramoisy brun" velvet with bands of black passementerie, lined with "brune" taffetta. This garment accords with a description of Mary's costume on the day of her execution given by Adam Blackwood, and the "iuppe de velours cramoisy brun" mentioned in La Mort de la Royne D'Escosse (1588).
 A jupe of crimson figured satin, with four bands of blue silk and silver passementerie, with fringes of the same, lined with white taffeta
 Cloaks or manteaux
 Tapestries and cloths of estate
 A dais or cloth of estate of violet silk, embroidered with the arms of Scotland and Lorraine.
 Another cloth of estate of "cramoisy" brown velvet, barred with silver passementerie.
 Other items in the wardrobe coffers
 The bodice of a velvet gown with a high collar, with sleeves embroidered with passementerie and jet
 A garniture or ornament for a gown with bands of pearls on black velvet

A further inventory was made at Chartley on 18 May of needlework in the keeping of Renée Rallay alias Mademoiselle de Beauregard. This includes 102 flowers worked in petit-point, 124 birds, and another 116 birds cut-out, 16 four-footed beasts including a lion attacking a wild boar, 52 fish, and other works of embroidery intended for a bed and a cloth of estate. Another paper (in two parts) in French describes the devices on Mary's bed, the embroidered emblems with Latin mottoes. Embroidery was a lifelong hobby and passion for Mary. She used designs from emblem books and illustrations from the natural history works of Conrad Gesner.  A ginger "catte" based on a woodcut of Gesner's may have been intended to represent Elizabeth I.

Treason as a cushion
A design with the Latin motto Virescit Vulnere Virtus (virtue grows strong by wounding) seems to signal her will and ambition to survive her rival. Made up a cushion cover as a gift to the Duke of Norfolk, the design featured a hand descending from heaven with a pruning hook, as if to clear away old growth for new shoots. This was interpreted as referring to Elizabeth as barren stock and the continuance of the English crown through the descent of Mary.

Inventories made in August 1586 and February 1587
In August 1586, possibly while Mary was taken to Tixall, an inventory was made of her jewels and silver plate in the keeping of Jean Kennedy. Some fabrics were in the keeping of Elizabeth Curle. There is also a short list of items stolen from Mary in 1586. The circumstances are unclear. The list includes a gold pincase to wear on a girdle, enamelled white and red, doublets of russet satin and canvas, a black velvet cap with a green and black feather, and three embroidered mufflers or scarves of which two were black velvet. Three "carcanet chains" or necklaces were embroidered with gold and silver.

The August 1586 inventory includes some linen and canvas for embroidery, and a bed of work of "rezel", le lict d'ouvraige de rezel. This was probably the same "reseau" network that Mary had crafted at Lochleven. The bed curtains were described again in English as "furniture for a bedd, of network and holland intermixed, not half finished".

After Mary's execution in February 1587 a list of her belongings, jewellery and apparell, in the possession of various members of her household was made. Jean Kennedy, Renée Rallay, Gillis Mowbray, and Mary Pagez, the daughter of Bastian Pagez, each held several items from the queen's wardrobe. Renée Rallay had the queen's embroidery silks. Some pieces, including the black velvet gown set with pearls were said to have been earmarked by Mary to be sold by her Master of Household, Andrew Melville of Garvock, to cover the expenses of the return of servants to Scotland.

The emblematic bed at Holyrood Palace in 1603
Some of Mary's things were sent to Scotland, and in April 1603, the secretary of Anne of Denmark, William Fowler noted or obtained a list of some of the emblems or devices embroidered on the curtains of Mary's bed at Holyrood Palace. Fowler's nephew William Drummond of Hawthornden sent a version of the list to Ben Jonson in 1619. The embroideries included a panel with a Latin motto Unus Non Sufficit Orbis, or "One world is not enough". An picture of a two loadstone magnets was captioned with an embroidered anagram of "Marie Steuart" in French as Sa Verteu M'attire, meaning "its virtue attracts me". This anagram had been used by Mary as a signature to a poem in 1574.

Mary's execution

During the investigations into the Babington Plot, the code breaker Thomas Phelippes interviewed Mary's two secretaries, Gilbert Curle and Claude Nau, and Jérôme Pasquier, groom of the chamber and master of Mary's wardrobe, in the Tower of London. Pasquier's role included buying cloth in London for the livery clothes of the household. He confessed to writing and deciphering coded letters for Mary, and had written a letter asking the French ambassador to seek a pardon for the plotter Francis Throckmorton.

Adam Blackwood wrote an account of the execution and her clothing. He said that Mary's veil, which reached the ground, was one usually worn on solemn occasions, or for important audiences. A narrative of Mary's execution by "R. W.", Robert Wingfield, mentions her costume as she left her bedchamber; "her borrowed hair" a wig, and on her head she had a dressing of lawn edged with bone lace, a pomander chain and an "Agnus Dei" about her neck, a Crucifix in her hand, a pair of beads (a rosary) at her girdle, with a golden cross at the end of them. She had a veil of lawn fastened to her caul bowed out with wire, and edged round about with bone lace. Her gown was of black satin painted, with a train and long sleeves to the ground, with acorn-shaped buttons of jet and pearl. She had short or half sleeves of black satin, over a pair of sleeves of purple velvet. Her kirtle was of figured black satin, her petticoat upperbody unlaced in the back of crimson satin, and her petticoat skirt of crimson velvet, her shoes of Spanish leather with the rough side outward, a pair of green silk garters, her nether stockings of worsted were coloured watchet (sky blue), clocked with silver, and edged on the tops with silver, and next by her leg, a pair of white Jersey hose.

The two executioners disrobed her, with her two women (Jean Kennedy and Elizabeth Curle) helping, and then she laid the crucifix upon a stool. One of the executioners took the Agnus Dei from her neck, and she laid hold of it, saying she would give it to one of her women. Then they took off her chain of pomander beads and all her other apparel. She put on a pair of sleeves with her own hands. At length, she was unattired and unapparelled to her petticoat and kirtle. Anything touched by the queen's blood was burnt in hall's chimney fire.

A version of the execution narrative written in the Scots Language mentions the burning of the executioners' clothes or anything touched by her blood; "all thingis about hir, belonging to hir, war takin from the executionaris and nocht sufferet so mutche to have ther aprones befor they war weshed, the blodie clothes, the blok, and quhatsumever [whatsoever] ellis war burnt in the chalmer". English and French narratives mentions that one the executioners found a little dog under her clothes while untying her garters.

Mary mentioned in a letter to the Bishop of Glasgow on 6 November 1577 that she had been sent "chaplets" or rosaries, and an "Agnus Dei" from Rome. These may be the items mentioned in the narrative of the execution. Another account of the execution, written by a Catholic writer, mentions that she wore a gown of black satin with French-style embroidery of black velvet. A gown of this description was listed at Chartley and after the execution. This writer does not mention the disrobing or any red clothes. A 19th-century historian James Anthony Froude conjectured that the "blood-red" costume, mentioned in Wingfield's account, was extraordinary and deliberate or "carefully studied". Red petticoats were not uncommon in Elizabethan England, and physicians such as Andrew Boorde thought that red clothes promoted health benefits. Recent writers suppose that Mary wore red to suggest an affiliation to martyrdom, since the colour may represent martyrdom.

A glove at Saffron Walden Museum is said to have been her gift to Marmaduke Darrell at Fotheringhay. He was an English administrator of her household. The leather glove is embroidered with coloured silks and silver thread, and lined with crimson satin.

The French ambassador in Edinburgh, Monsieur de Courcelles, bought black fabric from Henry Nisbet for mourning clothes for himself and his household including bombazine for doublets, and dyed Beauvais serge for his men, "sairg de Beauvois tainct en soye pour habiller votre gens en dueil".

See also
 Jewels of Mary, Queen of Scots
 Scottish Royal tapestry collection

References

External links
 Alison Rosie: Wardrobe of a Renaissance Queen: Mary’s Clothing Inventories
 The Dolls of Mary Queen of Scots, Historic Environment Scotland, 2019
 Shopping for Mary, Queen of Scots in 1548: Documents from the National Library of Scotland
 Manuscript account of the expenses of the royal children, 1551, (French), BnF Fr. 11207
 The Prison Embroideries of Mary, Queen of Scots: V&A
 Texts of the inventories of Mary, Queen of Scots texts with suggested translation: Elizabethan costume database, Drea Leed

Mary, Queen of Scots
16th century in Scotland
16th-century fashion
Early Modern Scotland
Scottish monarchy
Edinburgh Castle
British royal attire
Scottish clothing
Material culture of royal courts